Florida's 20th congressional district is a U.S. congressional district in Southeast Florida. It is currently held by Democrat Sheila Cherfilus-McCormick, who was elected in a January 2022 special election, following the death of Alcee Hastings on April 6, 2021. With a Cook Partisan Voting Index (CPVI) rating of D+25, it is one of the most Democratic districts in Florida.

The district includes most of the majority-black precincts in and around western and central Broward County and small portion of southeastern Palm Beach County, including places like North Lauderdale, Lauderhill, Lauderdale Lakes, Tamarac, Lake Park, Riviera Beach, Plantation, and Dania Beach,  along with parts of Pompano Beach and Sunrise. It also includes a vast area inland to the southeastern shores of Lake Okeechobee, including the community of Belle Glade. The district also includes Palm Beach International Airport. In the 2020 redistricting cycle, the city of Miramar was redrawn out of the district and into the 24th and 25th districts instead.

From 1993 to 2013, the 20th district took in parts of Broward and Miami-Dade counties. The district was based in Fort Lauderdale and included many of its suburbs including Davie. Most of that district is now the 23rd district, while the current 20th covers most of what was the 23rd district from 1993 to 2013.

The district is one of two majority-Black districts in Florida. The current representative, Sheila Cherfilus-McCormick, is the first Haitian-American woman elected to Congress from Florida.

Statewide election results

Presidential election results
Results from previous presidential elections

Non-presidential results
Results from previous non-presidential statewide elections

List of members representing the district

Election results

2002

2004

2006

2008

2010

2012

2014

2016

2018

2020

2022 (special)

2022 (General)

References

External links

20